Chimarrhis hookeri is a species of tree in the family Rubiaceae. It is native to South America.

References 

Trees of Peru
Dialypetalantheae